Atomic Ed and the Black Hole is a documentary released in 2001 by filmmaker, Ellen Spiro. The documentary was made for HBO's Cinemax Reel Life Series. Sheila Nevins served as Executive Producer and Lisa Heller served as Supervising Producer.  Karen Bernstein served as Producer.  Laurie Anderson provided her song, Big Science, for the soundtrack.

Ed Grothus (“Atomic Ed”) is a machinist-turned-atomic junk collector who more than 30 years ago quit his job of making atomic bombs and began collecting non-radioactive high-tech nuclear waste discarded from the Los Alamos National Laboratory.

Atomic Ed is the proprietor of “The Black Hole”, a second-hand shop and, next door, curator of the unofficial museum of the nuclear age.  His collection reveals and preserves the history of government waste that was literally thrown in a trash heap.

Awards and festival screenings
Best Documentary Short, South by Southwest Film Festival, 2001
Audience Award and Judges Competition First Place Award, Alibi Short Film Fiesta, Albuquerque, 2001
Melbourne International Film Festival, 2001
Hot Springs International Film Festival, 2001
Peace and Justice Filmmaker's Award, 2001
San Francisco Documentary Festival, 2001
SITE Santa Fe, 2001.

Articles
Halleck, Deedee. Hand Held Visions: Atomic Ed and the Black Hole.  2007-4-12.  Retrieved on 2007-6-20.
MacDonald, Scott. Pioneering Spirit: An Interview with Ellen Spiro.  Public Culture Duke University Press. 14.3 (2002) 469-475.   Retrieved on 2007-6-25.

See also
List of films about nuclear issues
List of books about nuclear issues

References

External links

2001 films
2001 documentary films
American documentary films
Anti-nuclear films
Documentary films about New Mexico
Documentary films about nuclear war and weapons
Films directed by Ellen Spiro
Los Alamos County, New Mexico
Films shot in New Mexico
2000s English-language films
2000s American films